Gorzegno is a comune (municipality) in the Province of Cuneo in the Italian region Piedmont, located about  southeast of Turin and about  northeast of Cuneo.

Gorzegno borders the following municipalities: Feisoglio, Levice, Mombarcaro, Niella Belbo, and Prunetto.

Demographic evolution

References 

Cities and towns in Piedmont